Anjunabeats Worldwide 05 is the fifth compilation album in the Anjunabeats Worldwide compilation series. It is mixed and compiled by British trance producer Ilan Bluestone, and was released on 25 May 2015 on Anjunabeats.
 The compilation is named after the radio show of the same name, which airs every Sunday evening on the internet radio Digitally Imported.

Track listing

References

Electronic compilation albums
2015 compilation albums
Trance compilation albums